Faryal Talpur (born 26 April 1958) is a Pakistani politician who had been a member of the National Assembly of Pakistan from 2008 to May 2018 and currently serving as a Member of the Provincial Assembly of Sindh as well as the President of the Women Wing of the Pakistan People's Party.

Early life and Family
Talpur was born on 26 April 1958 in Nawabshah, Pakistan to Hakim Ali Zardari and Bilquis Sultana. She belongs to Baloch family from Nawabshah, Sindh. She is the sister of Asif Zardari, the former President of Pakistan, and Azra Fazal Pechuho, a politician, and the sister-in-law of former Prime Minister of Pakistan Benazir Bhutto. 

She is married to  Mir Munawar Ali Talpur. She has 3 daughters; Aysha, Fatima and  Tania Talpur.

Political career
Talpur began her political career in 1990s. She ran for the seat of National Assembly of Pakistan on Pakistan Peoples Party (PPP) ticket from Nawabshah constituency (NA-160) in 1997 Pakistani general election for the first time, but lost the election to the Pakistan Muslim League (N). In 2001, she became the Nazim of district Nawabshah in local government elections. In 2005 local government elections, she was re-elected as the mayor of Nawabshah.

After the assassination of Benazir Bhutto in 2007, she became legal guardian of children of Bhutto; Bilawal Bhutto Zardari, Bakhtawar Bhutto Zardari and Aseefa Bhutto Zardari and custodian of property of Bhutto in Larkana. In 2007, Talpur was considered to become a candidate of PPP for the post of President of Pakistan.

Due to mayorship of Nawabshah, she was not given a ticket by PPP to run in 2008 Pakistani general election. However, later in by-elections, she was allotted a ticket by PPP to run for the seat of National Assembly home constituency of Bhutto in constituency NA-207 (Larkana-cum-Shikarpur-cum-Kambar Shahdadkot) where election was postponed due to death of Bhutto. She won in the by-elections and became member of the National Assembly for the first time. She was the central president of the women wing of PPP but reportedly she looked after almost all affairs of the PPP. Talpur is described as a tough and stubborn woman.

According to a WikiLeaks diplomatic cables leak in 2009, fearing attempts on his life, then President of Pakistan Asif Ali Zardari told then US Ambassador to Pakistan Anne W. Patterson that in the event he was assassinated, he had instructed his son Bilawal Bhutto Zardari to appoint Talpur as President of Pakistan. The diplomatic cable also revealed the remarks by then Chief of Army Staff of Pakistan General Ashfaq Pervaiz Kayani who said that Talpur would make a better president than Asif Ali Zardari. She was re-elected as the member of the National Assembly of the second time in 2013 Pakistani general election from NA-207 Larkana constituency.

She was re-elected to Provincial Assembly of Sindh as a candidate of PPP from PS-10 (Larkana-I) in 2018 Sindh provincial election. 

She is the member of the following committees:

 Public Accounts Committee

 Standing Committee on Energy

 Standing Committee on Home (Chairperson Committee)

 Standing Committee on Works & Services

References 

Living people
1958 births
Baloch politicians
Pakistan People's Party politicians
Pakistani MNAs 2008–2013
Pakistani MNAs 2013–2018
Women members of the National Assembly of Pakistan
Mayors of places in Pakistan
Pakistan People's Party MPAs (Sindh)
Sindh MPAs 2018–2023
Pakistani prisoners and detainees
Women mayors of places in Pakistan
Zardari family
21st-century Pakistani women politicians